The 2011 Aegon Championships (also known traditionally as the Queen's Club Championships) was a men's tennis tournament played on outdoor grass courts. It was the 109th edition of the Aegon Championships and was part of the ATP World Tour 250 series of the 2011 ATP World Tour. It took place at the Queen's Club in London, United Kingdom, in the club's 125th year. The tournament was scheduled to take place between 6 and 12 June 2011, however the finals were delayed to 13 June 2011 due to rain. The field was headlined by the 2008 champion and current world number one Rafael Nadal, four-time champion Andy Roddick, 2009 champion Andy Murray and defending champion Sam Querrey.

In the singles competition, the defending champion Sam Querrey lost in round three, paving the way for Andy Murray to win his second title; Murray became the first Briton since Gordan Lowe to win multiple Queen's titles.  While in the doubles the defending champion was absent, Bob and Mike Bryan won their 4th Aegon doubles title, their first since 2005.

Finals

Singles

 Andy Murray defeated  Jo-Wilfried Tsonga 3–6, 7–6(7–2), 6–4
It was Murray's 1st title of the year and 17th of his career. It was his 2nd win at the event, also winning in 2009.

Doubles

 Bob Bryan /  Mike Bryan defeated  Mahesh Bhupathi /  Leander Paes,  6–7(2–7), 7–6(7–4), [10–6]

Entries

Seeds

 1 Seedings are based on the rankings of May 23, 2011.

Other entrants
The following players received wildcards into the singles main draw:
  Daniel Cox
  Oliver Golding
  Ryan Harrison
  David Nalbandian
  James Ward

The following players received entry from the qualifying draw:

  Ilija Bozoljac
  Arnaud Clément
  Matthew Ebden
  Bobby Reynolds

Notable withdrawals
  Novak Djokovic (patellar tendinitis)
  Mardy Fish (abdominal injury)
  Richard Gasquet (leg injury)

References

External links

 Official website Aegon Championships
 Queen's Club website
 ATP tournament profile

 
Aegon Championships
Queen's Club Championships
Aegon Championships
Aegon Championships
Aegon Championships